The  was an army of the Imperial Japanese Army. It was raised and demobilized on four occasions.

History
The Japanese 2nd Army was initially raised during the First Sino-Japanese War from September 27, 1894, to May 14, 1895, under the command of General Ōyama Iwao.

It was revived for the Russo-Japanese War from March 6, 1904, to January 2, 1906, under the command of General Oku Yasukata. It fought in most of the major campaigns of the war, including the Battle of Nanshan, Battle of Te-li-Ssu, Battle of Tashihchiao, Battle of Shaho, Battle of Liaoyang, Battle of Sandepu, and Battle of Mukden.

The Japanese 2nd Army was raised again on August 23, 1937, and placed under the command of the Japanese Northern China Area Army as reinforcement to Japanese forces in China following the Marco Polo Bridge Incident. The 2nd Army participated in the North China Incident, Tianjin–Pukou Railway Operation, Battle of Xuzhou and Battle of Taierzhuang before being demobilized on December 15, 1938.

The fourth and final incarnation of the Japanese 2nd Army was on July 4, 1942, when it was revived under the command of the Japanese First Area Army in Manchukuo. It was transferred to the Japanese Second Area Army on October 30, 1943. Towards the closing stages of the war, on June 30, 1945, it was transferred to the Southern Expeditionary Army Group and was based in the Celebes at the end of World War II.

List of commanders

Commanding officer

Chief of Staff

References

External links

Military units and formations established in 1894
Military units and formations disestablished in 1945
02